

Season summary 
Unlike the previous year, Torino was unable to stay in the top 3. Torino managed to end their season in the top 5, collecting a new qualification for UEFA Cup.

Squad

Goalkeepers
  Silvano Martina
  Renato Copparoni
  Renato Biasi

Defenders
  Paolo Beruatto
  Massimo Brambati
  Giancarlo Corradini
  Roberto Cravero
  Luigi Danova
  Giovanni Francini
  Vittorio Pusceddu
  Ezio Rossi

Midfielders
  Flavio Chiti
  Antonio Comi
  Giuseppe Dossena
  Giacomo Ferri
  Júnior
  Marco Osio
  Danilo Pileggi
  Antonio Sabato
  Renato Zaccarelli

Attackers
  Franco Lerda
  Pietro Mariani
  Walter Schachner
  Lirio Torregrossa

Competitions

Serie A

League table

Matches

Topscorers
  Antonio Comi 7
  Júnior 4
  Giancarlo Corradini 3
  Giovanni Francini 3
  Walter Schachner 3

Coppa Italia 

First Round 

Eightfinals

Quarterfinals

UEFA Cup 

First round

Second round

References

Sources
  RSSSF - Italy 1985/86

Torino F.C. seasons
Torino